Bálint Nagy (1919 – 1965) was a Hungarian weightlifter. He competed at the 1948 Summer Olympics and the 1952 Summer Olympics.

References

External links
 

1919 births
1965 deaths
Hungarian male weightlifters
Olympic weightlifters of Hungary
Weightlifters at the 1948 Summer Olympics
Weightlifters at the 1952 Summer Olympics
People from Balmazújváros
Sportspeople from Hajdú-Bihar County
20th-century Hungarian people